European league may refer to:

 CERH European League (roller hockey)
 CERH Women's European League
 Men's European Volleyball League
 Women's European Volleyball League
 European Bridge League

See also
 Euro league (disambiguation)
 European Super League (disambiguation)
 UEFA Europa League (association football)
 FIBA Europe League (basketball)
 NFL Europe League (American football)